Ibrahim M. Oweiss (born September 25, 1931) is an Egyptian-born American economist, international economic advisor, and professor of economics at Georgetown University in Washington, D.C.

Biography

Early life and education
Oweiss received a Bachelor of Commerce degree from Alexandria University in Egypt, majoring in economics and political science, before moving to the United States to earn Masters and Ph.D. degrees in economics at the University of Minnesota.

Career
Oweiss joined the faculty of Georgetown University in 1967. While on leave from Georgetown, he was appointed to the cabinet of the Egyptian government as First Under-Secretary for Economic Affairs in 1977, and with rank of Ambassador, held the position of Chief of the Egyptian Economic Mission to the United States in New York.

Oweiss has authored over 50 scholarly publications, including several books. In a pioneering work on oil revenues, he introduced a term now widely used in global economics and business: "petrodollars". The influential Oweiss Demand Curve was first presented at Oxford University. He has been a prominent faculty member who shaped generations of Georgetown students in economics, international affairs, and related fields, including US President Bill Clinton (Class of 1968), who wrote the preface to Oweiss's memoir in 2011.  His academic interests have focused on international trade, especially free trade, and the economics of the Middle East. He has advocated for greater international cooperation and mutual understanding among countries. Oweiss is often noted by students for his humanistic, optimistic approach and his emphasis on maintaining values in the midst of scholarship and economic development.  Oweiss is currently Associate Professor Emeritus in the Department of Economics and teaches at the Georgetown University School of Foreign Service in Qatar.

Oweiss has served as an economic advisor for several governments, multinational corporations, and individuals, in the United States and abroad.  He was formerly an advisor to US President Jimmy Carter and business magnate Armand Hammer.

Oweiss was President of the Council on Egyptian-American Relations and the Association of Egyptian American Scholars, and a founding member of the Center for Contemporary Arab Studies at Georgetown University as well as the College of Commerce and Economics at Sultan Qaboos University in Oman. In February 2009, Oweiss spoke on "The Global Depression and the Gulf Economies" at the Georgetown Qatar Campus.

In a 2005 article by Egypt's Al-Ahram Weekly, Oweiss stated that Egyptian expatriate scholars like himself "never let go of their ties with their home country." The article suggests this bond with his native Egypt was Oweiss's motivation for having "offered his services to the Egyptian government" to be "assigned by President Anwar El-Sadat as chief of the Egyptian economic mission to the US in 1977."  In the article, Oweiss goes on to state, "I have always been involved in Egyptian affairs... I have twice presided over the Egyptian American Scholars Association and have overseen several projects that aimed at technology and knowledge transfer back to Egypt."

Selected publications

Awards and honors
Order of Merit (Egypt), First Class

Grand Cordon of the Order of Mohammed Ali Pasha
Knight of the Order of the Queen of Sheba
Ibrahim Oweiss Lecture

References

External links
Home page at Georgetown University
Faculty page at Georgetown University, School of Foreign Service in Qatar (archived July 21, 2006)

1931 births
Living people
University of Minnesota College of Liberal Arts alumni
American economists
American people of Egyptian descent
Georgetown University faculty
Recipients of the Order of Merit (Egypt)
Alexandria University alumni
Recipients of orders, decorations, and medals of Ethiopia